Cottam power station is a decommissioned coal-fired power station. The larger coal-fired station, was decommissioned by EDF Energy in 2019 in line with the UK's goal to meet its zero-coal power generation by 2025. The smaller in-use station is Cottam Development Centre, a combined cycle gas turbine plant commissioned in 1999, with a generating capacity of 440 MW. This plant is owned by Uniper.

The site is one of a number of power stations located along the Trent valley. Under the Central Electricity Generating Board in 1981/82 Cottam power station was awarded the Christopher Hinton trophy in recognition of good housekeeping the award was presented by junior Energy Minister David Mellor. After electricity privatisation in 1990, ownership moved to Powergen. In October 2000, the plant was sold to London Energy, who are part of EDF Energy, for £398 million.

In January 2019, EDF Energy announced that the coal station was due to cease generation in September 2019 after more than 50 years of operation. The station closed as planned on 30 September 2019. Demolition of Cottam Power Station began in 2021, with Brown and Mason carrying out the works.

Construction
Work was begun in April 1964 on the site of Mickleholme Farm by the Central Electricity Generating Board Midlands Project Group from Bournville. Mickleholme Farm laid between the precipitators and the cooling towers. The modernist architects for the buildings on site were the Nottingham practice of Yorke Rosenberg Mardall. Extensive use was made of 'Cottam Amber' coloured cladding around the boiler and turbine house, 'emphasising its functional grandeur at the heart of the complex'. The English architectural critic Reyner Banham dubbed the office block as 'over-wrought and made gratuitously rhetorical'. 

The main contractor for the construction of the 2,000 MW power station was Balfour Beatty. The coal plant was supplied by the New Conveyor Company of Smethwick. John Thompson boilers supply steam to English Electric 500 MW steam turbines. The maximum continuous rating of each boiler is 2,400 lb/sq.in and 568 °C at the superheater. The power station opened in 1968 when owned by the Central Electricity Generating Board.

The ground level before construction varied between 3.35m and 5.18m (11 and 17 ft) ordnance datum (O.D.) In order to provide adequate protection against flooding, the area in which the main building is constructed was raised to 7.92m (26 ft) ordnance datum by filling from borrow pits on site, but the coal store and cooling tower area remain at the original level of 4.87m (16 ft) ordnance datum. The nature of the sub-soil was investigated by trial bores and found to be good load bearing marl at depths between 4.26m and 12.19m (14 and 40 ft) below the existing ground level and overlain by sand and gravel strata on top of which lay clay or silt and top soil.

The main building is 209.39m (687 ft) long by 124.35m (408 ft) wide and houses four 500 MW boiler-turbine units. The height of the boiler house is 65.22m (214 ft) and turbine house 34.44m (113 ft). The building is of steel construction with blockwork up to 10.66m (35 ft), above which there is a light-weight corrugated sheet cladding and windows.

An interesting feature of the construction of this building was the way in which the civil and steel erection work was phased. By completing the pile caps on units 1 and 2, the steel erection work was able to progress, while pile caps and flooring were completed on units 3 and 4. This enabled the steel work to be erected on units 3 and 4 from finished floor level while the flooring was being completed on units 1 and 2. This reduced the time taken to construct the main building.

Within the boiler house and between boilers 2 and 3, an escalator was erected which in several stages extended to the boiler drum level to assist with the movement of men and materials. 

To the north of the main building is the precipitator bay and chimney. The four flues from the boiler are contained within a single chimney which stands 190.5m (625 ft) above ground level. In order to improve plume dispersal, the outer chimney casing is terminated 7.62m (25 ft) short of the four flues which stand at a height of 198.12m (650 ft)

To the east of the main building are eight cooling towers which are 114.3m (375 ft) in height and have a base diameter of 94.48m (310 ft) overall. Beyond this are the coal plant and the coal stocking area. The 400kV switching station is to the south of the site from which feeders join the National Grid system by way of other substations in the area. To the west are the station workshops and administration block of offices, which are connected to the turbine house by an enclosed overhead walkway. Other associated buildings such as the control block, water treatment plant house, oil storage compound etc., are disposed around and adjacent to the main building.

Considerable attention has been paid to landscaping the site in order to improve the visual appearance of the large plant. The cladding of the main building is painted in “Cottam Amber” colour, which blends perfectly with the brickwork of houses and farms in the vicinity. Extensive grassing and tree planting was carried out on land around the site when all the construction work was finished.
A 15m high tree-clad ridge was constructed to designs by Kenneth and Patricia Booth to shield Cottam village from the visual mass and noise of the station.

Boilers
The four 500 MW boilers at Cottam Power Station were manufactured by John Thompson Water Tube Boilers Limited, in conjunction with Clarke Chapman & Co. Ltd. Each has an evaporation rate at M.C.R. of 1.542 tonne/hour (3,400 lb/hr). The boiler plant has been designed for short time overload operation. By bypassing two of the H.P. feed heaters and increasing the firing rate by 8% an increase of 5% electrical output can be obtained.
 
Coal is fed from the bunker to the fuel pulverising mills by variable speed drag-link feeders. The four barrel-type mills rotate at 15 rev/min and are swept by hot air which carries the pulverised fuel (P.F.) mixture to eight classifiers that reject any unground pieces of coal back to the mill. Eight exhausters pass the P.F. to 32 turbulent P.F. burners arranged in four rows of eight burners on the boiler front. Each P.F. burner has an integral oil burner which is used for lighting up purposes and low load operation when instability with P.F. firing would be experienced. Combustion air is fed to the burners by two forced draught fans which pass warm air ducted from the top of the boiler house through two rotary regenerative air heaters to the secondary or combustion air registers around each burner. The air heaters can be bypassed on the gas and air side to facilitate optimum operating conditions.
 
The boiler feed water passes through the economiser before entering the drum and is then circulated around the combustion chamber water wall tubes by any three of the four boiler water circulating pumps. Steam from the drum is passed to the H.P. turbine through a horizontal primary superheater bank, pendant superheater platens, and pendant final superheater bank. The superheater platens which are situated directly above the combustion chamber differ from other heaters in that the heat is imparted to the steam by radiation as well as convection. The other heaters are later in the gas duct and rely mainly on convection for heat transfer. Steam temperature control is achieved by two stages of attemperation, one of which is between the primary super heater and the superheater platens and the other, which controls the final steam temperature, is immediately before the final superheater inlet. Exhaust steam from the H.P. turbine is returned to the boiler for reheating at a constant pressure before being returned to the I.P. turbine. This achieved by a horizontal primary and a pendant final reheater situated in the gas duct. Steam temperature control is achieved by non-contact type attemperators.
 
The boiler is kept clean by 42 gun type soot blowers in the combustion chamber and 42 long retractable blowers which clean the pendant and convection surfaces, all operating under automatic control from the control room.
 
The hot gasses from the combustion chamber are drawn through the super heater and re-heater banks, air heater and precipitators by induced draught fans which expel the gasses through the F.G.D. to the chimney. The fans maintain a slight vacuum within the combustion chamber in order to prevent combustion gasses leaking into the boiler house. The precipitators which are entirely of steel construction collect the dust by electrostatic means and there are no mechanical collectors.

Turbo-alternators
Each of the four turbines is an English Electric Company multi-cylinder impulse reaction machine operating on a single reheat cycle with terminal steam connections of 158.6 bar (2,300 lbf/in2), 566 degrees Celsius (1051 degrees Fahrenheit) and exhausting at a back pressure of 1.5 in Hg. Steam from the boiler passes through four strainers and two pairs of combined stop and emergency valves, each pair being associated with two throttle valves which regulate admission of steam to the H.P. cylinder inlet belt. The H.P. cylinder comprises eight stages in total. The steam expands through the first five stages towards the governor end and then reverses its direction and flows between the inner and outer case to the last three stages. Reversing the steam flow within the H.P. cylinder helps to balance the thrust thus relieving the load on the single thrust bearing. From the H.P. cylinder the steam is fed to the boiler reheater and returned to the I.P. cylinder through two strainers and two pairs of I.P. emergency valves, each pair of which is associated with a pair of interceptor valves which are attached to the cylinder. The I.P. section of the turbine is double flow with seven stages to each flow.
 
The exhaust steam from the I.P. cylinder is passed to the three L.P. cylinders by cross-over pipes reducing cross sections, which distribute the flow of steam equally to each L.P. cylinder through which it expands to the condenser. Each cylinder is double flow with five stages to each flow. A special feature of the Cottam machines is the radial condenser in which the tube nests are disposed right round the turbine L.P. shafts in a common casing. This reduces the steam velocity in the exhaust space, which together with the reduced losses in the exhaust duct improves the efficiency of the condenser. The weight of the whole structure is some hundreds of tons less than earlier structures, and the foundation block is also greatly simplified, since only a rudimentary structure above basement floor level is necessary under the L.P. turbine.

Feed Water System
Following condensation of the low pressure exhaust steam in the condenser, the feed water is passed to a condensate sump mounted under the condenser. From this receiver the condensate is drawn by one or two extraction pumps and passed through a discharge strainer. The low pressure feed heating system consists of five Direct Contact heaters with one high level deaerator to provide a high feed pump suction head. The Direct Contact L.P. heaters are arranged in two banks, comprising three and two heaters respectively. Within each bank the heaters are stacked above each other so that the condensate drains from the lower pressure heater below by gravity. The heights of the heaters are approximately inversely proportional to the bled steam pressures. The advantages of Direct Contact heaters are essentially that thermal efficiency is improved, capital cost is reduced due to fewer numbers of extraction pumps being required, and the system is entirely ferrous.
 
The main extraction pump discharges the condensate to No.1 D.C. heater from which it cascades down to No.2 and then to No.3 D.C. heater by gravity. Two lift pumps deliver the condensate to No.4 D.C. heater, from which it cascades through No.5 D.C. heater to two deaerator lift pumps. The deaerator lift pumps discharge the condensate to the deaerator and from there it passes through microwire and magnetic filters to the boiler feed pump suction main. The main boiler feed pump is driven by a steam turbine which receives its steam from the main H.P. turbine exhaust. It comprises a single cylinder eleven stage turbine turning at 5,000 rev/min and driving a multi-stage pump to give a delivery pressure of 2,940 lbf/in2. Two electrically driven Starting and Standby feed pumps are provided.
 
The high pressure heating system consists of two parallel banks of two heaters, numbered 7 and 8. Each of the H.P. heaters is vertical and of the non-contact type. From the H.P. heaters the condensate, at a temperature of 253 degrees Celsius (455 degrees Fahrenheit), is passed into the boiler economiser. During unit shutdowns the whole of the feed system can be ‘blanketed’ with nitrogen gas. This is an attempt to reduce the rate at which copper and ferrous oxides form, hence reduce the ‘carrying over’ of these oxides to the boiler drum.
 
Boiler feed water make-up is supplied by the Water Treatment Plant. This has a continuous rating of 3,672,000 Litres (970,000 gallons) in 24 hours at 153,300 litres (40,500 gallons) per hour. The plant comprises three groups of cation, anion and mixed bed ion exchange resin units, together with vacuum degassing and pressure filtering plant. Each group processes 76,650 litres (20,250 gallons) per hour and normally two groups are in service at one time, with the third on standby or being regenerated.

Circulating Water System
The River Trent is tidal and navigable at the location of the station. The Trent River Board estimated the average and minimum summer flow rates to be 2,500 and 1,818 million litres per day (550 and 400 million gallons) respectively. There is no salt penetration to this reach of the river.

The total requirement for circulating water at Cottam Power Station is approximately 259.1 million litres per hour (57 million gallons per hour), and to meet the conditions of the River Board in respect of temperature and water extraction the station is designed to work with a closed circuit cooling tower system drawing only purge and make-up water from the river. The average water requirement from the river is in the order of 113.7 million litres per day (25 million gallons per day), of which 40.91 – 59.1 million litres (9-13 million gallons) are required to make good evaporation losses.

The C.W. system comprises a twin culvert fed by four vertical spindle pumps feeding the condensers arranged in two parallel groups, and discharging to eight cooling towers. The cooled C.W. from the tower ponds is returned to the pump suction for re-circulation. A special feature of the C.W. plant at Cottam is the annular moat arrangement around the pump house. The moat is 45.72m (150 ft) external diameter, 5.486m (18 ft) deep and 3.048m (10 ft) wide. Suction for the four pumps is taken tangentially from the inside of the moat. This arrangement causes a continual circular, vortex free flow of water within the moat and allows any combination of the four pumps to be operated as the station demands.

To prevent formation of slime and bacterial growth automatic, intermittent dosing is provided at each condenser inlet.

Each of the eight natural draught cooling towers has a normal capacity of 30.69 million litres per hour (6.75 million gallons per hour), with a normal cooling range of 8.5 degrees Celsius (47 degrees Fahrenheit). "De-icing" equipment is installed on the periphery of each tower, together with "eliminators" which reduces the system loss caused by carry over of water droplets.

Coal Plant
The Coal Plant at Cottam Power Station was decommissioned in 2019 and ceased energy generation.

Previous operations
The station consumption of coal, assuming 100% load factor, was 18,594 tonnes (18,300 tons) per day, or 5,080,235 tonnes (5,000,000 tons) per year, which was shipped in from overseas. The station was supplied with coal via a three-mile branch line off the Manchester and Cleethorpes railway line. This was reopened in 1967. Rail facilities included a west-facing junction on the Cleethorpes line, former oil sidings, two coal discharge lines with gross- and tare-weight weighbridges and coal hoppers. The site was capable of containing another station of comparable size, and in this case the coal input of the combined stations would approach 8,128,375 tonnes (8,000,000 tons) per year. The coal handling plant at the existing station was capable of extension to meet this requirement. All coal was delivered by rail over seven days of the week. Special 24.89 (24.5) and 32.51 tonne (32 ton) capacity wagons were developed with bottom hopper doors to suit the unloading equipment at this and other stations.

The maximum daily intake was in the order of 25,401 tonnes (25,000 tons) and was brought in by trains of approximately 1,016 tonnes (1,000 tons) payload. The on-site rail sidings formed a continuous loop and wagons were unloaded while the train was moving at 0.8047 km/h (0.5 mph) by means of automatic lineside equipment. The coal was then  discharged into an underground hopper of approximately 609.6 tonnes (600 tons) capacity. Weighing of the fuel and empty wagons was carried out automatically while the train was moving. The time between receiving the train and its departure was less than 60 minutes.

From the underground hopper the coal could be fed either to the bunkers in the boiler house, which had a capacity of 9,348 tonnes (9,200 tons), or to the coal stocking area. ‘Stocking Out’ was accomplished by a single radial boom conveyor feeding a working stock area of 40,642 tonnes (40,000 tons) capacity. From the working stock coal was moved by mobile plant to the permanent stock which will have a capacity of about 1,016,047 tonnes (1,000,000 tons). Reclaiming from both permanent and working stock was by mobile plant which moved the coal into an underground hopper and hence to bunkers by means of duplicate conveyor belts, each of 1,524 tonnes (1,500 tons) per hour capacity. All operations on the coal plant, including signalling for the locomotive while on site, were controlled from a central room which was situated adjacent to the unloading hopper.

The last coal train delivery to Cottam power station was carried out by GB Railfreight number 66735 on 19 June 2019.

Ash and Dust Plant
The lifetime dust and ash make of the station is estimated to be in the order of 13,761,988 and 3,440,497 cubic metres (18 million and 4.5 million cubic yards) respectively. In raising the general station area to above river level borrow pits were created within the power station site. This, together with the filling of the remainder of the site, has made available approximately 6,116,439 cubic metres (8 million cubic yards) of ash disposal. In addition there were a number of disused gravel pits in the area, amounting to approximately 12,232,878 cubic metres (16 million cubic yards), which were to be reclaimed by filling with ash from Cottam and other nearby power stations, one being the Idle Valley Nature Reserve.

On full load operation of the four units, in the order of 975 tonnes (960 tons) per day of furnace bottom ash will be made. The ash is continuously quenched in the furnace and sluiced from the hoppers to crushers local to the boiler before being pumped to the ash disposal area. At the disposal area large ash is screened out and the remaining slurry is cycloned and classified. The de-watered ash is then discharged to the drainage area from which loading on to road vehicles was carried out by mechanical shovel. The effluent from the cyclones and the drainage area is pumped to ash “lagoons” on site.

The precipitator hoppers have sufficient capacity to hold the dust make for 24 hours, in which time in the order of 3,902 tonnes (3,840 tons) of dust will be made. The control of the dust extraction, pumping and disposal plant is automatic with the overall control centralised in a control room adjacent to the plant. The precipitator hopper outlets are electrically heated to facilitate dust extraction. From the hoppers the dust is fed by pneumatic air flow conveyors into a “wetting” unit which feeds into a sluice system discharging into a dust sump. The sump is emptied by single stage pumps discharging to the dust lagoons on site or in the vicinity of the station. To provide for dry dust disposal one of the three precipitators on each unit can be selected to discharge to a pneumatic conveyor feeding a 1,016 tonne (1,000 ton) capacity dry bunker. The discharge from the storage bunker can be taken dry into sealed road dust tankers, or conditioned with water into open type road vehicles.

Control Room
The station control room is situated to the east of, and adjacent to the turbine house. The control room, which is on the operating floor level, contains four separate unit control desks, together with control panels for common services such as the C.W. system, 400kV switching and works electrical system. Each unit control console comprises a semi-circular control desk, above which is an alarm facia suspended from the ceiling. Behind each control desk stands a semi-circular instrument panel. All unit operation covering start-up, loading and shut downs are carried out by the Unit Operator who sits at the control desk. The concept of the control is that all operations are divided into discrete stages, each fully automatic and self-checking, with fault alarms and light indications to show the state of the plant. The sequence for each stage is initiated by one switch on the control desk. The object of the automatic 'fixed logic' sequence control is to give consistent starting techniques which meet the matching requirements of both boiler and turbine and allows the unit to be loaded in as short a time as possible. Equipment is also provided for running up, loading and deloading the turbine as fully automated functions. Each unit has a 400 channel data logger which records instrument readings automatically and reduces the work load on the unit operator. Information recorded by the data logger is used for efficiency monitoring purposes.

Communications on the station are covered by the normal dialling telephone, and 'direct wire' telephones to important positions on the plant. Communications between control room and 'roving' operators is achieved by miniaturised personal radio equipment. A 'bleeper' radio system was also used for locating staff on the station. The site has a 24-hour security team permanently based at Cottam. Routine vehicle and foot patrols are constantly carried out. A comprehensive CCTV system is installed which enables the whole site to be comprehensively monitored around the clock.

Gas turbines
Four 25MW gas turbine generating sets were installed in the station, in a separate building adjacent to the 400kV switching station. Their provision basically  provided for:

 An independent supply to the station auxiliary system in time of heavy load and low frequency on the system. Operation to meet this condition was automatic including run up, synchronising of the gas turbine and load transfer.

 Peak lopping by export through the unit or station transformers.

 Standby to the unit transformers.

 Start up supplies when isolated from the grid system.

Each unit consisted of two Rolls-Royce Avon RA29 Stage 6A (1533) gas generators in parallel feeding hot gas into an English Electric Co. ltd., two stage turbine which drove a 25MW alternator. The exhaust gasses were passed into independent metal stacks, each 106.68m (350 feet) in height. The plant which was normally left un-attended could be run up to full load in a little under two minutes. These gas turbines were decommissioned on the arrival of the CCGT installation at Cottam Power Station.

400kV Switching Station
The switching station (or substation) is of outdoor construction and follows the layout and design developed and standardised by the CEGB. Special attention was given to the external appearance of the structures for amenities considerations. The switching station is a double bus bar system, with the main bar arranged in four sections interconnected by four section switches and two main reserve bar coupling switches. One generator is connected to each main bus bar section by way of oil filled 400kV cables. The switchgear, bus bars and isolators are rated at 3,500 MVA. In recent times several of the air blast circuit breakers were replaced by more modern SF6 (sulphur hexafluoride) gas circuit breakers. Also, following decommissioning of the power station, the switchgear serving each of the four generator circuits was removed. The maximum continuous load current rating is 4,000 amps. The switching station forms part of the bulk transmission system interconnecting and distributing energy from the East Midlands and Yorkshire generating stations to the load centres in the south of England. The entire switching station was originally controlled from the station control room  but later controlled from National Grid's national control centre.

Operation

Cottam Development Centre

The Cottam Development Centre is a 400 MW combined cycle gas turbine (CCGT) power station, fuelled by natural gas. It was built as a joint venture between Powergen and Siemens, as a testbed for Siemens to develop CCGT technology.

Construction of the station commenced in July 1997 on a football and cricket pitch adjacent to the coal-fired power station. During construction, heavy components weighing up to 400 tonnes were brought onto site using inland waterways, to avoid damaging local roads. The station opened in September 1999. In May 2002 the station was bought out by Powergen for £52 million.

Specification
The power station generates electricity using a single Siemens V94.3A (now called a SGT5-4000F) gas turbine, one BENSON heat recovery steam generator and one steam turbine. Electricity from the station has a terminal voltage of 21 kilovolts (kV), and enters the National Grid via a transformer at 400 kV. The plant has a thermal efficiency of 58%.

Closure
On 7 January 2019, EDF Energy confirmed that the coal-fired power station would close on 30 September 2019 due to "challenging market conditions." This meant the plant was in operation for over half a century, despite being designed to operate only 30 years. At the time of the announced closure it was one of seven coal-fired power stations in operation, with the government on target to take polluting coal power off the grid by 2025. Cottam Power Station desynchronised Unit 1 from the grid at 14:50 on 23 September 2019. The station closed on 30 September 2019. The nearby West Burton power station has capacity agreements in place for three of the four units for the delivery year 2020/21 (up until the end of September 2021). Once demolished, the site of the station is planned to become a 'garden community' of 1500 houses.

Demolition
As of March 2023, no official date of demolition has been announced but the demolition contract has been assigned to controlled demolition experts Brown and Mason.

References

External links

 EDF Energy - Cottam Power Station
 Uniper UK
 Pictures
 Standing on The Shoulders of Giants - Cottam Power Station History Book

Bassetlaw District
Biofuel power stations in England
Buildings and structures in Nottinghamshire
Coal-fired power stations in England
Natural gas-fired power stations in England
Power stations in the East Midlands
1968 establishments in England
Energy infrastructure completed in 1968
2019 disestablishments in England